Michael M. Greenwood (9 April 1935 – 29 April 2021) was an English footballer who played as a midfielder.

Career
Greenwood, who played as an amateur for Bishop Auckland at the time, represented Great Britain at the 1960 Summer Olympics, making one appearance in the tournament. He combined his football career with working as a PE teacher.

He later worked at the National Sports Centre at Lilleshall Hall and was also employed by the Sports Council in West Yorkshire.

Later life
As of April 2012 he was living in Harrogate, North Yorkshire. He organises reunions for the surviving players of the 1960 Olympic squad.

In April 2012, Greenwood publicly expressed a number of concerns about the British team due to compete at the 2012 Summer Olympics in London.

He died on 29 April 2021.

References

1935 births
2021 deaths
English footballers
Bishop Auckland F.C. players
Footballers at the 1960 Summer Olympics
Olympic footballers of Great Britain
Association football midfielders
Footballers from Barnsley